The Labour Member of Parliament for Tottenham, Bernie Grant, died on 8 April 2000, creating a by-election in his constituency.

Grant was one of the first four black MPs and the constituency was one of the centres of the London Afro-Caribbean community. However, Grant's widow Sharon (who was white) declared her intention to seek selection and this split opinion within the local Labour Party. Both Sharon and Bernie Grant had been on the left-wing of the party whereas the leading black contender for the nomination, David Lammy, was a supporter of Tony Blair.  After a close-fought selection battle, Lammy was chosen.  During the campaign, Sharon Grant made a public show of supporting his election campaign in order not to allow disunity in the Labour Party.

Polling day in the by-election was on 22 June, when Lammy comfortably retained the seat for Labour on a low turnout. Neither of the other main party candidates was able to mount a credible challenge in a seat where Labour was so strongly ahead, with Liberal Democrat candidate and future Chippenham MP Duncan Hames finishing second, and Conservative candidate and future Battersea MP Jane Ellison coming third.

All three candidates from the Labour, Conservative and Lib Dem parties in this by-election would go on to become MPs. Lammy won and became the MP for Tottenham a seat he holds to this day, Lib Dem Duncan Hames became the MP for Chippenham in 2010, losing in 2015 and Jane Ellison became the MP for Battersea in 2010, losing in 2017.

Results

General Election result, 1997

References

2000 elections in the United Kingdom
2000 in London
By-elections to the Parliament of the United Kingdom in London constituencies
Elections in the London Borough of Haringey
Tottenham